The Green Album is the ninth studio album by Kottonmouth Kings. It was released on October 28, 2008 under Suburban Noize Records. The album peaked at #5 on the Billboard Top Rap Albums chart, and #42 on the Billboard 200. As of August 1, 2012 The Green Album has sold over 325,000 copies in the US. AllMusic reviewer David Jeffries wrote that "If you haven't figured it out from the album's title, the song titles, or even the band's name, The Green Album is a pro-weed album from aging cottage industry insiders known as the Kottonmouth Kings. [...] [The album] finds them a bit more out of touch with what's happening in the rest of the music world."

Track listing

Versions
In addition to the different packages sold with the album on Subnoize Records, an extra disc was sold with the Best Buy version, and extended versions of the songs "Time", "Where I'm Going", "Pack Your Bowls", and "Trippin" are sold on the iTunes digital download of the album.

Best Buy Bonus Disc Track Listing

Personnel
Daddy X - Vocals, Lyrics
D-Loc - Vocals, Lyrics
Johnny Richter - Vocals, Lyrics
Lou Dogg - Drums, Percussion
DJ Bobby B - Engineering, Turntables, Production, DJ
Brother J - Vocals, Lyrics ("Freeworld")
Tech N9ne - Vocals, Lyrics ("Sex Toy"), ("Problem Addict")
The Dirtball - Vocals, Lyrics ("Green Grass")
Judge D - Vocals, Lyrics ("Take A Ride")
Potluck - Vocals, Lyrics ("Stoner Bitch")

Chart positions

References

Kottonmouth Kings albums
2008 albums
Suburban Noize Records albums